Henry Learmonth Cook (29 March 1914 – January 1987) was a Scottish footballer who played for Kilmarnock and Dumbarton.

References

1914 births
1987 deaths
Association football inside forwards
Dumbarton F.C. players
Kilmarnock F.C. players
Scottish Football League players
Scottish footballers